Rajendra Reang is an Indian politician and the former Executive Member of Tripura Tribal Areas Autonomous District Council. He is the member of the Communist Party of India (Marxist) and the former President of Tribal Youth Federation(TYF).

He represent 1-Damcherra-Jampui constituency in North Tripura district in Tripura Tribal Areas Autonomous District Council.

See also 
 Radhacharan Debbarma
 Daniel Jamatia

References 

People from North Tripura district
Living people
Tripuri people
Tripura politicians
Communist Party of India (Marxist) politicians
Communist Party of India (Marxist) politicians from Tripura
Date of birth missing (living people)
Year of birth missing (living people)